Ellen Brandt-Forster, also Ellen Forster-Brandt (11 October 1866 – 16 July 1921) was an Austrian operatic soprano.

Life 
Born in Vienna, Brandt-Forster studied at the Wiener Konservatorium and first performed in Danzig in 1885. From 1887 to 1906 she appeared at the Vienna State Opera. In 1897 she became Kammersängerin.

She was considered an outstanding Wagner interpreter, but also performed successfully in concert halls, especially with Hugo Wolf's songs on Oesterreichisches Musiklexikon

She died in Baden bei Wien at age 54.

Further reading 
 Felix Czeike 2 (1993); ÖBL 1 (1957); [Kat.] 100 Jahre Wr. Oper 1969, 83; NFP 24.10.1884, 7, 5.7.1921, 7; Badener Ztg. 6.7.1921, 1; Salzburger Volksbl. 29.4.1898, 4; Fremden-Bl. 13.12.1914, 24; Prager Tagbl. 4.12.1905

References

External links 
 Ellen Forster on Geschichtewiki.wien
 Brandt Forster Ellen sangerin 1866–1921 on ZVAB
 

1866 births
1921 deaths
Musicians from Vienna
Austrian operatic sopranos
Österreichischer Kammersänger
University of Music and Performing Arts Vienna alumni
19th-century Austrian women opera singers
20th-century Austrian women opera singers